The Littoral Region is a region of Cameroon. Its capital is Douala. , its population was 3,174,437. Its name is due to the region being largely littoral, and associated with the sea coast.

The Douala Edéa Wildlife Reserve is in the region.

2008 presidential decree abolishes provinces
The President of the Republic of Cameroon, Paul Biya, signed decrees in 2008 abolishing "Provinces" and replacing them with "Regions". Hence, all of the country's ten former provinces are now known as Regions.

Demographics

Divisions

The region is divided into Three departments (départements):
 Nkam, with its capital at Yabassi.
 Sanaga-Maritime, with its capital at Édéa.
 Wouri, forming the area around the major city of Douala.

These are in turn broken down into subdivisions. Presidentially appointed senior divisional officers (préfets) and subdivisional officers (sous-préfets) govern each. Traditional leaders, usually referred to as chiefs in English, often preside over particular ethnic groups or villages; nevertheless, many of these wield very little power today.

Culture

Traditional Dance

Traditional musical instruments

Traditional dance accessories

Traditional clothes

Hair style and head covers Monuments in the Region 

Common Dishes in the Region

Wildlife
Animals in the Douala Edea Wildlife Reserve

Notes and references

 
Regions of Cameroon